Simo Vuorilehto, titled Vuorineuvos (born August 8, 1930 in Savonlinna, Finland), is a Finnish businessman and the former chairman and CEO of Nokia Corporation. He became the chairman and CEO in 1988 after the death of Kari Kairamo. In 1990 he was replaced as chairman by Mika Tiivola. He remained CEO until 1992 when he was succeeded by Jorma Ollila.

References

Living people
1930 births
Finnish chief executives
Nokia people